Ameritech Mobile Communications, LLC was the first company in the United States to provide cellular mobile phone service to the general public.  Cell service became publicly available in Chicago on October 13, 1983. The company was a division of Ameritech which, as of January 1, 1984, was the holding company of Illinois Bell, Michigan Bell, Wisconsin Bell, Ohio Bell, and Indiana Bell, which provides landline service to the Great Lakes region. From around 1986, Cincinnati Bell held a 45% stake in the company. Originally named Ameritech Mobile Communications, it later became known as Ameritech Cellular.

Before the SBC Merger Ameritech sold some of its interests to GTE dba Verizon. Following the SBC Communications merger, Ameritech's wireless network was integrated and added to SBC's Wireless network. Originally Ameritech used CDMA as its network technology choice, but then converted to TDMA to be compatible with SBC's other wireless networks that were mostly using TDMA. During the SBC Communications merger its First and Original network in Chicago was sold to GTE (which later became Verizon Wireless).

Ameritech Mobile Communications exists today as Ameritech Mobile Communications, LLC d/b/a AT&T Mobility.

The Guinness Records claims "the Most durable mobile phone number (cellular phone number) David Contorno, of Lemont, Illinois, has owned and used the same mobile telephone number since 2 August 1985. His first mobile phone was an Ameritech AC140 and his carrier has been Ameritech Mobile Communications ever since."

References

External links 
 Archive of Ameritech Cellular Intercept Messages

AT&T subsidiaries
1983 establishments in Illinois